The following is a list of mayors of the municipality of Caguas, Puerto Rico.

List of mayors

18th century
 Sebastián Jiménez, circa 1812
 José Escolástico Quiñónez, circa 1815
 Sebastián Ximénez, circa 1816
 Marcos Ximénez, circa 1818
 Vicente Aponte, circa 1820
 José Acosta, Mateo Pérez, Alexo de Mercado, Pedro Ramírez de Arellano, Florencio Ximénez, Sebastián Ximénez, circa 1821
 Juan Francisco Vázquez, circa 1822
 Juan Guadalupe Colón, circa 1823
 Manuel Suárez Valdéz, circa 1824
 José Paúl, circa 1826
 José Paúl, Gerardo Rabassa, circa 1827
 Juan Alonso, circa 1828
 Gerardo Rabassa, circa 1829
 Joaquín Goyena, circa 1831
 Luis María Valdelluly, circa 1832
 Manuel de Lastra, circa 1833
 Manuel Jiménez Córdova, circa 1835
 Gerardo Rabassa, circa 1836
 Antonio Guadalupe Colón, circa 1836
 Marcos Jiménez, circa 1838
 Vicente Aponte, circa 1840
 Zoilo de la Cruz, circa 1841
 Pedro Sánchez, circa 1842
 Antonio Grillo, Ramón Santiago, circa 1843
 Marcos Jiménez, circa 1844
 Vicente Balseiro, circa 1847
 Joaquín Mariano Polo, circa 1850
 Manuel Giménez Córdova, Antonio Guadalupe Colón, circa 1852
 Juan Alonso, circa 1853
 Félix O’Neill, Juan González Lafont , circa 1854
 Escolástico Fuentes, Pedro Bruno, Bruno Ruiz de Porras, circa 1855
 Celedonio Flores, circa 1856
 Leonardo de Campos, circa 1859
 Sandalio Jiménez, Juan Francisco de Acosta, circa 1861
 Manuel S. Cuevas, circa 1865
 Eduardo Tafaró, circa 1866
 Joaquín Martore, circa 1867
 Ramón Hernández, circa 1869
 Ventura Barber, circa 1871
 Pedro José Berríos, circa 1872
 Pascual Borrás, circa 1874
 Adón Somonte, circa 1875
 Antonio Royer, circa 1878
 José María de la Vega , circa 1879
 Pedro Pastor Egea, circa 1885
 Eduardo Vidal y Ríos, circa 1889
 Rafael Polo, circa 1890
 Francisco Méndez, circa 1893
 José M. Solís, circa 1897
 Vicente Muñoz Barrios, circa 1898
 Celestino Solá, Antonio Jiménez Sicardó, Gervasio García, Ramón Sotomayor, circa 1898
 Gervasio García, circa 1900

20th-21st centuries
 Gabriel Jiménez Sanjurjo, circa 1907
 José Domingo Solá, circa 1909
 Gervasio García, circa 1911
 Enrique Moreno, circa 1913
 Juan Jiménez García, circa 1918
 Domingo Laza Quiñónez, circa 1924
 Pablo J. Héreter, circa 1928
 Yldefonso Solá Morales, circa 1929
 Antonio Rojas, circa 1930
 José Reguero González, circa 1932
 Juan Jiménez García, circa 1833
 Julio Aldrich, circa 1937
 Manuel Seoane, circa 1941
 Cruz Cruz Muñoz, circa 1949
 Angel Rivera Rodríguez, circa 1952
 Miguel Hernández Batalla, circa 1968
 Ángel O. Berríos, 1973-1976, 1981-1996
 Miguel Hernández, circa 1976
 William Miranda Marín, 1997-2010
 William Miranda Torres, 2010-present

References

Bibliography
 

caguas